JCL Team Ukyo is a Japanese UCI Continental cycling team established in 2012. It is managed by the Japanese racing driver Ukyo Katayama.

Team roster

Major wins

2013
Overall Tour of East Java, José Vicente Toribio
Stage 2, José Vicente Toribio
2015
 National Road Race Championships, Kazushige Kuboki
2016
Stage 2 Tour de Ijen, Benjamin Prades
Stage 5 Tour de Flores, Benjamin Prades
Overall Tour of Japan, Oscar Pujol
Stage 6 Oscar Pujol
Overall Tour de Kumano, Oscar Pujol
Stage 2 Oscar Pujol
Stage1 Tour de Hokkaido, Jon Aberasturi
2017
Overall Tour de Taiwan, Benjamin Prades
Stage 1 Tour de Tochigi, Salvador Guardiola
Stage 3 Tour de Tochigi, Egoitz Fernández
Stage 3 Tour of Thailand, Jon Aberasturi
Overall Tour de Lombok, Nathan Earle
Stages 1 & 2, Nathan Earle
Overall Tour of Japan, Oscar Pujol
Stage 4 Jon Aberasturi
Stage 6 Oscar Pujol
Stages 1 & 4 Tour de Korea, Jon Aberasturi
 National Road Race Championships, Yusuke Hatanaka
Stages 1 & 5 Tour of Qinghai Lake, Jon Aberasturi
2018
Stage 2 Tour de Taiwan, Robbie Hucker
Stage 3 Tour de Tochigi, Raymond Kreder
Stage 1 Tour of Thailand, Raymond Kreder
Stage 5 Tour de Korea, Raymond Kreder
Overall Tour de Kumano, Marc de Maar
2019
Overall Tour de Tochigi, Raymond Kreder
Stage 3 Raymond Kreder
Stage 4 Tour of Japan, Raymond Kreder
Stage 1 Tour de Korea, Raymond Kreder
 National U23 Road Race Championships, Kosuke Takeyama
Stage 3 Tour de Hokkaido, Raymond Kreder
Overall Tour de Ijen, Robbie Hucker
2022
Overall Tour de Taiwan, Ben Dyball
Stage 2 Ben Dyball
Stage 4 Raymond Kreder
Overall Tour of Japan, Nathan Earle
Stage 1 Nathan Earle
Stage 2 Ben Dyball
Stage 4 Raymond Kreder
Overall Tour de Kumano, Nathan Earle
Oita Urban Classic, Ryuki Uga
Stage 6 Tour of Thailand, Nathan Earle
Tour de Okinawa, Benjamín Prades

References

External links
 

UCI Continental Teams (Asia)
Cycling teams established in 2012
Cycling teams based in Japan